Sharif Abd al-Ilah Pasha ibn Muhammad ( al-Sharīf ‘Abd al-Ilāh Bāshā ibn Muḥammad;  Şerif Abdülilah Paşa bin Muhammed; 184527 October 1908) was a sharif of the Awn clan who was briefly  proclaimed Sharif and Emir of Mecca in 1882. He was appointed again in 1908 but died before reaching Mecca.

Biography
Sharif Abd al-Ilah was born in 1261 AH (1845), the youngest son of Sharif Muhammad Ibn Awn.

On 28 Shawwal 1299 AH (September 1882) Vali Osman Nuri Pasha deposed Sharif Abd al-Muttalib ibn Ghalib of the Zayd clan and unilaterally installed Abd al-Ilah as Emir. In late Dhi al-Qidah 1299 AH (October 1882) Sultan Abd al-Hamid overturned the appointment and instead appointed Abd al-Ilah's brother Awn al-Rafiq as Emir. Abd al-Ilah served as acting Emir until his brother's arrival in early Dhi al-Hijjah (October 1882). In 1883 he moved to Istanbul where on 24 Rabi al-Awwal (3 February 1883) he was awarded the rank of vezir and appointed to the Council of State.

After Awn al-Rafiq's death in 1905, Abd al-Ilah was rejected for the Emirate in favor of his nephew Sharif Ali ibn Abd Allah, who was actively support by Vali Ratib Pasha. After Ali was deposed, Abd al-Ilah was finally named Emir on 28 Ramadan 1326 (24 October 1908). However only a few days later he died in Istanbul, on 2 or 3 Shawwal 1326 AH (27 or 28 October 1908).

Honours
Rank of Vezir, 3 February 1883
Nişan-ı Osmani, 1st Class
Nişan-ı Mecidi, 1st Class

Residence
His seaside residence, the Şerifler Yalısı ("yalı of the Sharif") in the Emirgan neighborhood of Istanbul, has been converted into a museum.

Notes

References

 
 
 

1845 births
1908 deaths
19th-century Arabs
Sharifs of Mecca
People from Istanbul
Arabs from the Ottoman Empire
Dhawu Awn